Eamonn Anthony O'Brien  is a professor of mathematics at the University of Auckland, New Zealand, known for his work in computational group theory and -groups.

Education
O'Brien obtained his B.Sc. (Hons) from the National University of Ireland (Galway) in 1983. 
He completed his Ph.D. in 1988 at the Australian National University. His dissertation, The Groups of Order Dividing 256, was supervised by Michael F. Newman.

Research
O'Brien's early work concerned classification, up to isomorphism, of groups of order 256. He developed early computer software to complete the classification, and to verify that the classification can correct errors in earlier counting. This led to classifications of many further families of small order groups. In 2000, together with Bettina Eick and Hans Ulrich Besche, O'Brien classified all groups of order at most 2000, excluding those of order 1024. The groups of order 1024 were instead enumerated. This classification is known as the Small Groups Library. These classifications comprise the tables provided in the computer algebra systems SageMath, GAP, and Magma.

For a 20-year span from the mid-1990s, O'Brien led the
so-called Matrix Group Recognition Project whose primary objective is to 
solve the following problem: given a list of invertible matrices over a finite field, determine the composition series of the group.
Implementations of algorithms that realize the goals of this project form the bedrock of matrix group computations in the computer 
algebra system Magma.
 
O'Brien's collaborations include resolution of several conjectures include the Ore conjecture, according to which all elements of non-abelian finite simple groups are commutators.

Awards
 2021 New Zealand Mathematical Society Kalman Prize 
 2021 University of Auckland Research Excellence Medal 
 2020 Hector Medal, Royal Society of New Zealand.
 2009 Fellow of the Royal Society of New Zealand
 2004 New Zealand Mathematics Research Award 
 1995 Humboldt Fellow,

Selected publications

References

External links
Personal homepage
List of Publications

Year of birth missing (living people)
Living people
Group theorists
New Zealand mathematicians
Australian National University alumni
Academic staff of the University of Auckland
Fellows of the Royal Society of New Zealand